The King's College (TKC or simply King's) is a private non-denominational Christian liberal arts college in New York City. The predecessor institution was founded in 1938 in Belmar, New Jersey, by Percy Crawford. The King's College draws more than 500 students from 37 states and 15 countries. The college announced its impending closure in March 2023.

History

Percy B. Crawford founded The King's College in 1938 in Belmar, New Jersey. The school re-located in 1941 to the Lexington mansion on the 65-acre former estate of Major Philip Reybold near Delaware City, Delaware, and again in 1955 to the former Briarcliff Lodge site in Briarcliff Manor, New York. At Briarcliff, The King's College sponsored the King's Tournament, a sports tournament in which East Coast Christian college athletes competed each year.

After Crawford's death, Robert A. Cook became the college's second president in 1962. The college prospered under his leadership, with enrollment growing to a high of 870 students in 1980. After 23 years as president, Cook retired and became the college's chancellor in 1985, a position which he held until his death in 1991. Friedhelm Radandt succeeded Cook to become the college's third president. Nine years later, in December 1994, the college shut down, as a result of years of declining enrollment, financial troubles, and the deterioration of the Briarcliff campus. The college had purchased property for a new campus at Sterling Forest, but was prevented from selling the Briarcliff campus in a timely fashion. The college declared bankruptcy, owing more than $25 million to its creditors, mostly from the mortgage on the new campus.

Reestablishment in New York City
The college charter first granted by the New York Board of Regents in 1955 remained in force. In 1997, the college's charter was amended to make Campus Crusade for Christ the sole member of the corporation. Together with Campus Crusade founder Bill Bright, J. Stanley "Stan" Oakes, then the director of Faculty Commons, a Campus Crusade ministry, began work to pay off the institution's debts and re-establish it in New York City. Instrumental in this process was the acquisition of Northeastern Bible College, which was founded by a friend of Percy Crawford but had experienced a similar decline and closure to that of King's. In 1999, King's leased  of space on three floors of the Empire State Building in New York City for classrooms, a student recreation center, and administrative offices. Radandt remained president, with Oakes as chairman. In January 2003, Oakes became the fourth president. Five years later, Oakes became chancellor and board member Andy Mills served as interim president. 

Following treatment for brain cancer, Oakes reassumed the presidency on January 1, 2009. In December 2009, the college announced that Oakes would take a year-long sabbatical while Andy Mills again served in an interim role.

On August 23, 2010, the college announced the appointment of the conservative writer Dinesh D'Souza as its new president. On October 18, 2012, D'Souza resigned his post at the school shortly after it became known that he booked a room at a hotel with a woman who was not his wife. After it became clear that D'Souza was having an affair, he claimed to be engaged to another women,  despite the fact that he was still married to his former wife. While a search committee was formed to select a permanent president, Andy Mills filled in for a third time.

In 2012, the college relocated from the Empire State Building to a new location one block south of Wall Street on Broadway (Manhattan). The college also became independent of Campus Crusade in 2012.

On July 11, 2013, the college announced the appointment of Gregory Alan Thornbury, former dean of the School of Theology and Missions at Union University, as the sixth president of the institution.

On November 21, 2017, the college announced that Thornbury would become its Chancellor and retired Air Force Brigadier General Tim Gibson would serve as Interim President. Mark Hijleh, formerly Vice President for Academic Affairs, was concurrently appointed Provost, and Brian Brenberg, Associate Professor of Business and Economics and chair of the programs in business and finance, was appointed an Executive Vice President. Thornbury served as Chancellor during the transition period, and later stepped down to give greater place to scholarly and artistic pursuits. This included post-publication opportunities related to his book on the Christian rock-and-roll artist Larry Norman. In June 2018, the college purchased a former hotel in the Financial District to become a student residence. Gibson was formally appointed the seventh president of King's on August 21, 2018.

Impending closure 
In March 2023, the university began notifying students that the school would soon close due to financial difficulties exacerbated by the global COVID-19 pandemic. The recent addition of online learning at King's was unable to fully address the issues. An emergency loan, from an executive at the firm partnered with the college to offer online learning, reportedly extended the school's survival through the end of the spring 2023 semester.

Academics
The college is authorized by the Board of Regents to grant Bachelor of Arts and Bachelor of Science in Business degrees in a total of nine majors. Students are also able to pursue 16 different minors.

All students at King's take a Core Curriculum, an interdisciplinary, Great Books-style curriculum focused on Christian scripture; politics, philosophy and economics; and the traditional liberal arts.

The King's College also offers semester-long visiting students programs in journalism, theater, and business for undergraduates from other schools. The New York City Semester program has 34 partner schools, including Biola University, University of Mississippi, and Uganda Christian University.

Accreditation
Since 2009, The King's College has been accredited by the Middle States Commission on Higher Education.

Student life

During the 2016–2017 academic year, the college enrolled over 220 new students from 10 countries and 43 states, for a total enrollment of over 600 students. The average ACT score of the 2015 incoming class was 26, and the average SAT score was 1730 (on a 2400 scale).  The King's College adopted the Classic Learning Test (CLT) as a third admissions option for students in the summer of 2016.

Residence life
King's does not require attendance at chapel services, and students are not required to sign a statement of faith, although faculty and staff are. Instead, students sign an honor code pledging not to "lie, steal, cheat, or turn a blind eye to those who do. Every student is honor bound to confront any other student who breaches the code." This is described by the school as "the minimum standard of ethical behavior that all students have contracted to live by." Students live in groups of three or four in apartments in high-rise apartment buildings in the Financial District and Brooklyn. During the summer, King's leases these apartments to students in the city for summer internships.

King's has a house system. All incoming students are assigned to one of ten established houses, which are named after historic leaders: Ronald Reagan, C.S. Lewis, Dietrich Bonhoeffer, Corrie ten Boom, Queen Elizabeth I, Margaret Thatcher, Sojourner Truth, Susan B. Anthony, Winston Churchill, and Clara Barton. Students are encouraged to develop strong ties within their houses. During the year, they participate in inter-house competitions such as "The Great Race," a scavenger hunt throughout the city and the House GPA contest, where each house attempts to achieve the highest average GPA. The competitions are tracked throughout the year, with the winning house receiving the "House Cup." Houses also host events including dinners, dances, and annual events like the Super Bowl Party traditionally hosted by the House of Bonhoeffer, and the annual Red & Green Affair dance, hosted by the houses of Lewis and Thatcher.

As upperclassmen, students are eligible for election by their peers to one of four house leadership positions: President, Scholar, Helmsman, and Chamberlain. Each position has certain spiritual, academic, or residence life responsibilities within the house.

All students are required to participate in Interregnum, a semi-annual weekend of academic competitions centered around an annual theme. The theme is chosen to prompt moral and ethical questions, and is paired with 1-6 required readings. The various competitions, such as parliamentary debate, performing arts, and a 24-hour film competition, are completed as a part of the House Cup and are inspired by the annual theme and various readings. Interregnum also includes an annual lecture from a speaker pertinent to the theme, traditionally as an opening to the spring semester activities.

Extracurricular activities
King's has many student groups, including The King's Debate Society, which was ranked 53rd in the world in 2013 worldwide ranking by the International Debate Education Association (IDEA), and Mock Trial, which puts students in the shoes of courtroom lawyers and witnesses, competing against other colleges at a regional and national level.

REFUGE is a bi-weekly worship service held on campus. During lunch on Mondays, the community participates in the public reading of Scripture. Other clubs include The King's Players, resident theater company, which puts on plays once a semester, and The King's Dancers, which schedules dance practices, performances, and outings.

Other organizations include The King's Council, the King's student government group; the Empire State Tribune, the King's student newspaper; and The King's Players. King's students are encouraged to start groups they see a need for at the college.

Athletics

The King's athletic teams are the Lions. The college is a member of the United States Collegiate Athletic Association (USCAA), primarily competing in the Hudson Valley Intercollegiate Athletic Conference (HVIAC) since the 2004–05 academic year. The Lions formerly competed as a member of the National Christian Collegiate Athletic Association (NCCAA); as well as a founding member of the Central Atlantic Collegiate Conference (CACC) (currently an athletic conference in the Division II ranks of the National Collegiate Athletic Association (NCAA) from 1961–62 to 1988–89.

The King's competes in 10 intercollegiate varsity sports: Men's sports include basketball, cross country, rugby, soccer and track & field; while women's sports include basketball, cross country, soccer, track & field and volleyball.

Most teams at The King's were student-started and run as club teams before transitioning to varsity status.

Notable faculty
 Anthony Bradley, author of Ending Overcriminalization and Mass Incarceration: Hope from Civil Society and research fellow at the Acton Institute.
 Peter Kreeft, philosopher, theologian, and author

References

Further reading
Briarcliff Lodge/King's College at Xydexx:  "Exploring" and "Modern Ruins"
Briarcliff Lodge and The King's College at Hudson Valley Ruins

External links

Official athletics website

 
1938 establishments in New Jersey
Belmar, New Jersey
Educational institutions established in 1938
Educational institutions disestablished in 1994
Educational institutions established in 1999
Evangelicalism in New York (state)
Financial District, Manhattan
Briarcliff Manor, New York
Nondenominational Christian universities and colleges in the United States
Universities and colleges in Manhattan
USCAA member institutions
Liberal arts colleges in New York (state)
1994 disestablishments in New York (state)
1999 establishments in New York City
Conservative organizations in the United States